Bernard Richard Millar Johnson FRCS (25 April 1905 – 18 May 1959) was the dean of the Royal College of Anaesthetists from 1952 to 1955.

References

Deans of the Royal College of Anaesthetists
English anaesthetists
People from Fulham
Fellows of the Royal College of Surgeons
Royal Army Medical Corps officers
British Army personnel of World War II
1905 births
1959 deaths